Bruce Russell (born 1960) is a New Zealand experimental musician and writer.

He is a founding member and guitarist of the noise rock trio The Dead C and the free noise combo A Handful of Dust (with Alastair Galbraith). He has released solo albums featuring guitar and tape manipulation, and has contributed articles to British music magazine The Wire.

He established the Xpressway record label, which was active from 1985 until the early 1990s, releasing mostly cassettes and a few records. Russell then founded the Corpus Hermeticum record label. Xpressway released only music by New Zealanders, usually song-based.  Corpus Hermeticum releases, in contrast, may feature New Zealand or international artists, and they eschew song forms in favour of free-form, experimental, usually improvised sounds.

In summer of 2013, Bruce Russell's daughter Olive Russell uploaded a documentary of her father that she shot and edited herself called "27 Minutes with Mr. Noisy: A Documentary about Bruce Russell" to Vimeo.com.

Trivia
During his time at the University of Otago, Bruce Russell was a member of that university's champion team in the television quiz University Challenge.

During the South African Springbok rugby team's controversial 1981 tour of New Zealand, Russell received two police convictions as a student leader of protests against the tour.

For a period Russell worked as an archivist in Radio New Zealand's Sound Archives.

Russell climbed Mount Fuji for a retired librarians charity in 1994.

Discography
Project for a Revolution in New York
Maximalist Mantra Music (Crank Automotive car08)
Painting the Passports Brown
Sights (with Ralf Wehowsky) (Corpus Hermeticum HERMES041)
Birchville Cat Motel & Bruce Russell (with Birchville Cat Motel)
Midnight Crossroads Tape Recorder Blues (with Ralf Wehowsky)
21st Century Field Hollers and Prison Songs (w.m.o/r26, 2006)
Antikythera Mechanism (The Spring Press)
Virginia Plane (with Lasse Marhaug) (The Spring Press)
The Movement of the Free Spirit (The Spring Press)

Bibliography
Bruce Russell, Left-handed blows: writing on sound, 1993–2009 (Auckland: Clouds, 2010) 
Bruce Russell (ed.), Erewhon Calling: Experimental Sound in New Zealand (Auckland: Audio Foundation/CMR, 2012)

External links 
 Interview at Perfect Sound Forever online magazine

References

Living people
1960 births
New Zealand musicians
Noise musicians
Experimental musicians
Free improvisation
Protests in New Zealand
South Africa Rugby Union Tour of New Zealand, 1981
Sports riots
Rugby union controversies
Rugby union and apartheid
Contestants on New Zealand game shows
Siltbreeze Records artists